S. E. U. I. S. is a 1982 video game published by Strategic Simulations.

Gameplay
S. E. U. I. S. is a game in which the player uses a fleet of spaceships to fight for control of the Ozgortian sector.

Reception
Chris Smith reviewed SSI's RapidFire Line in The Space Gamer No. 59, and commented that "My resulting disappointment lay in the fact that this game, unlike the others in the line, added nothing new to the computer game field. Combining strategic space games with arcade was a good idea, but there are still better arcade games of both kinds."

Dick Richards reviewed the game for Computer Gaming World, and stated that "I can think of only one real negative to the game. . .its name. Whether you call it SEUIS, or Shoot 'Em Up In Space, it sounds dim. But, if every game I buy plays as well and offers as much flexibility, then I really don't care what it's called."

References

External links
1984 Software Encyclopedia from Electronic Games
Review in Electronic Games

1982 video games
Apple II games
Apple II-only games
Shoot 'em ups
Strategic Simulations games
Turn-based strategy video games
Video games developed in the United States
Video games set in outer space